The year 1733 in science and technology involved some significant events.

Physiology and medicine
 Rev. Stephen Hales publishes Hæmastaticks, the second volume of his Statical Essays, in London, containing the results of his experiments in measuring blood pressure.

Inventions
 May 26 – The flying shuttle loom is patented by John Kay, making weaving faster and increasing demand for yarn.
 The perambulator or pram (a baby carriage) is invented by English architect William Kent for children of the 3rd Duke of Devonshire.
 The achromatic refracting lens is invented by English barrister Chester Moore Hall.

Mathematics
 Giovanni Gerolamo Saccheri studies what geometry would be like if the parallel postulate (Euclid's fifth) were false.
 Abraham de Moivre introduces the normal distribution to approximate the binomial distribution in probability.

Births
 January 18 – Kaspar Friedrich Wolff, German surgeon and physiologist (died 1794)
 February 19 – Daniel Solander, Swedish botanist (died 1782)
 March 13 – Joseph Priestley, English chemist (died 1804)
 March 17 – Carsten Niebuhr, Danish cartographer, surveyor and traveller (died 1815)
 May 4 – Jean-Charles de Borda, French mathematician, physicist, political scientist, and sailor (died 1799)
 May 22 – Alexander Monro, Scottish anatomist (died 1817)
 July 27 – Jeremiah Dixon, English surveyor and astronomer (died 1779)

Deaths
 June 23 – Johann Jakob Scheuchzer, Swiss natural historian (born 1672)

References

 
18th century in science
1730s in science